Here is a list of administrative posts (postos administrativos) of Mozambique, sorted alphabetically by province and district, based on the National Statistics Institute of Mozambique.

See also
Provinces of Mozambique
Districts of Mozambique

References 

Mozambique geography-related lists
Populated places in Mozambique